Amrollah (also Romanized as Amrollāh) is a village in Ujan-e Gharbi Rural District, in the Central District of Bostanabad County, East Azerbaijan Province, Iran. At the 2006 census, its population was 389, in 63 families.

References 

Populated places in Bostanabad County